Anime Midwest is an annual three-day anime convention held during July at the Hyatt Regency O'Hare and Stephens Convention Center in Rosemont, Illinois. The convention is held in the same location as Anime Central.

Programming
The convention typically offers anime screenings, artist room, cosplay masquerade contest, date auction, dealers room, fan panels, formal dance, guest autographs, karaoke, Maid Cafe, rave dances, video game tournaments, and workshops. The convention hosts a free ConSweet with free ramen noodles, rice, oatmeal, and soda for attendees.

History
Anime Midwest moved to the Hyatt Regency O'Hare in Rosemont, Illinois for 2013. The convention in 2015 had long registration line waits. Guests Deadlift Lolita, FEMM, Fuki, and Zwei could not attend Anime Midwest in 2019 due to visa issues. Anime Midwest 2020 was cancelled due to the COVID-19 pandemic. In 2021 the convention required masks, and had a reduced ConSweet due to the convention having a short amount of organization time.

Event history

Collaborations
In 2012 Anime Midwest sponsored a cosplay prom.

Controversy
Ryan Kopf, the organizer behind Anime Midwest, was banned from Anime Milwaukee during the 2018 convention due to a sexual assault allegation involving the Milwaukee Police Department. Kopf was at the convention as part of Anime Midwest and denies the allegations.

Gallery

References

External links
 Anime Midwest Website
 AnimeCon.org Website

Anime conventions in the United States
Recurring events established in 2011
2011 establishments in Illinois
Annual events in Illinois
Festivals in Illinois
Tourist attractions in Cook County, Illinois
Conventions in Illinois